Askøyværingen is a local newspaper published in Askøy, Norway.

History and profile
Askøyværingen was founded in 1978. The newspaper is published twice a week, on Tuesdays and Fridays. It is owned by Lokalavisene, a subsidiary of the owner of Bergens Tidende which also owns Fanaposten and Bygdanytt. 

In 2010 Askøyværingen had a circulation of 5,208 copies. The circulation of the paper was 5,108 copies in 2012.

References

External links
 Official site

1978 establishments in Norway
Newspapers established in 1978
Newspapers published in Norway
Norwegian-language newspapers
Askøy